Bakhtin (Russian: Бахтин) is a Russian masculine surname originating from the obsolete verb bakhtet (бахтеть), meaning to swagger; its feminine counterpart is Bakhtina. The surname may refer to the following notable people:
Aleksandr Bakhtin (born 1971), Russian football player
Igor Bakhtin (born 1973), Russian football coach and player
Ivan Bakhtin (1756–1818), Russian government official and writer 
Mikhail Bakhtin (1895–1975), Russian philosopher, literary critic and scholar 
Svetlana Bakhtina (born 1980), Russian gymnast

References

Russian-language surnames